Amit Das may refer to:

 Amit Das (cricketer, born 1989), Indian cricketer
 Amit Das (cricketer, born 1992), Indian cricketer